Raaga is a 2017 Indian Kannada-language romantic drama film directed by P. C. Shekar and produced by Mithra. It features a love affair between two blind people, played by Mithra and Bhama. Whilst the soundtrack and score is by Arjun Janya, the cinematography is by S. Vaidi.

The film released on 21 April 2017.

Cast 
 Mithra
 Jay D'Souza as Gowtham
 Bhama as Anu/Anusuya
 Avinash
 Rangayana Raghu
 Sadhu Kokila
 Roopika
 Bhau
 Nandini Vittal
 Jai Jagadish
 Ramesh Bhat
 Chandan Sharma
 'Kaddipudi' Chandru
 Niranjan Deshpande

Soundtrack
The score and soundtrack for the film was composed by Arjun Janya. The audio released on 20 March 2017. Lyricists Jayanth Kaikini, V. Nagendra Prasad and Kaviraj have been signed in to pen the songs.

References

External links
 
 

2017 films
2010s Kannada-language films
2017 romantic drama films
Films about blind people in India
Indian romantic drama films
Films scored by Arjun Janya
Films set in 1950